The Bill Collector is a family drama film featuring Danny Trejo and written and directed by Cristobal Krusen.

Plot
When Lorenzo Adams, a top bill collector at Lump Sum Collections, finds out that a dangerous man named Uncle Frankie has tracked Lorenzo to Norfolk, Virginia and is coming to collect money that Lorenzo has owed him for a few years, he finds no one to help but Pastor Kevin (Ron Kenoly) and desperate down-and-outers from an inner city mission; who serve as unwitting pawns in Lorenzo’s scam to pay Frankie back.

Production notes
Filming took place in Hampton Roads and Norfolk, Virginia.

Cast 
Danny Trejo as Frankie Guttierez
Gary Ray Moore as Lorenzo Adams
Ron Kenoly as Pastor Kevin
Brandon Hardesty as Iggy
Elizabeth Omilami as Wanda
Tom Ohmer as Stan Davenport
David Krusen as Omar
Kera O'Bryon as Ramona
Tamara Johnson as Therese

References

External links

Films set in Norfolk, Virginia
Films set in Virginia
Films shot in Virginia
Pure Flix Entertainment films
2010s English-language films